Gorna Banya is a Sofia Metro station on the M3 line. It was opened on 24 April 2021 as part of the second section of the line, from Ovcha Kupel to Gorna Banya, and serves as the southwest terminus of the M3 line. The adjacent station is Ovcha Kupel II.

Location 
The station is located at Boycho Boychev str. in the northmost part of the Ovcha Kupel 2 microdistrict. It is also close to the recently built Gorna banya train stop, which was built especially because of the metro station itself.

Interchange with other public transport 
• City Bus service: 11, 60, 73, 102, 111

References 

Sofia Metro stations
2021 establishments in Bulgaria
Railway stations opened in 2021